Viljo Anton Pousi (17 January 1918, Kymi - 6 January 1981) was a Finnish welder, union representative and politician. He was a member of the Parliament of Finland from 1966 to 1970, representing the Social Democratic Union of Workers and Smallholders (TPSL). He was later active within the Socialist Workers Party (STP).

References

1918 births
1981 deaths
People from Kotka
Social Democratic Union of Workers and Smallholders politicians
Socialist Workers Party (Finland) politicians
Members of the Parliament of Finland (1966–70)